Leon B. Postigo, officially the Municipality of Leon B. Postigo (Subanen: Benwa Leon B. Postigo; Chavacano: Municipalidad de Leon B. Postigo), is a 4th class municipality in the province of Zamboanga del Norte, Philippines. According to the 2020 census, it has a population of 27,639 people.

The municipality, originally named Bacungan, was formed out of the southwestern barangays of Sindangan by virtue of Batas Pambansa No. 204 on March 25, 1982. It was renamed to its current name by virtue of Republic Act No. 6830 on December 30, 1989, in honor of Leon Bayot Postigo, a Philippine Constabulary corporal whose 10-hectare lot in the town was donated by his heirs to the local government.

Geography

Barangays
Leon B. Postigo is politically subdivided into 18 barangays.

Climate

Demographics

Economy

See also
List of renamed cities and municipalities in the Philippines

References

External links
 Leon B. Postigo Profile at PhilAtlas.com
Official website
 [ Philippine Standard Geographic Code]
Philippine Census Information

Municipalities of Zamboanga del Norte